Stemonosudis macrura is a deep-water marine; bathypelagic fish living at the depth range , member of family Paralepididae . The fish is known to distributed in Indo-Pacific and eastern Pacific Ocean from around Point Conception State Marine Reserve in California in the north to Chile in the south.

It was first formally described in 1933 by Vilhelm Ege. It is oviparous with planktonic larvae.

References 

Paralepididae
Taxa named by Vilhelm Ege
Fish described in 1933